Bali/Witu Rural LLG is a local-level government (LLG) of West New Britain Province, Papua New Guinea. The Bali and Vitu languages are spoken in the LLG.

Wards
01. Penata
02. Garomatong
03. Kumburi
04. Lovanua
05. Mundua
06. West Garove
07. East Garove

References

Local-level governments of West New Britain Province